Wiedemannia jugorum is a species of dance flies, in the fly family Empididae.

References

Wiedemannia
Insects described in 1893
Diptera of Europe